Kitti may refer to:

 Kitti's hog-nosed bat
 Kitti (municipality)
 Kitti (name)
 Marko Kitti
 Kitti Thonglongya
 Kitti Kudor
 Kitti Gróz
 Kitti Becséri
 Kitti Sri Megha

See also
Kiti (disambiguation)